Reepham railway station may refer to:

Reepham railway station (Lincolnshire)
Reepham railway station (Norfolk)
Whitwell & Reepham railway station, also in Reepham, Norfolk